The Baoji–Lanzhou high-speed railway is a high-speed railway operated by China Railway High-speed between Baoji in western Shaanxi province and Lanzhou, the capital of Gansu province. The railway cut the rail travel between Baoji and Lanzhou from five hours to one hour and a half (two hours in revenue service). It connects with the Xi'an–Baoji high-speed railway to the east and the Lanzhou–Urumqi high-speed railway to the west.
The feasibility study report has been approved by the National Development and Reform Commission. The construction work was expected to start in the first half of 2011, but it actually started in October 2012. The line started operations on July 9, 2017.

Seven stations are built along the line: Baoji South, Dongcha, Tianshui South, Qin'an, Tongwei, Dingxi North, and Lanzhou West. 92% of the total length is elevated or in tunnels. The total investment is estimated to be  (US$10 billion). It is the first railway to serve Qin'an and Tongwei.

Stations

References 

High-speed railway lines in China
Rail transport in Shaanxi
Rail transport in Gansu
Standard gauge railways in China
4
Railway lines opened in 2017